Manor Park is a neighbourhood of Dartmouth, Nova Scotia, Canada. The main entrance to the neighbourhood is from the east on Portland Street (Route 207).  A secondary entrance, from the west, is by way of Celtic Drive, rising from the low-lying area around Lake Banook.

Within this neighbourhood is Brownlow Park, one of Dartmouth's local parks.  The park, named after Dan Brownlow, a former Mayor of Dartmouth, includes two tennis courts, a basketball court, a soccer field, a children's playground, and a pathway for joggers. The area also abuts Oathill Lake, which is surrounded by a wooded area with a walking trail. This lake is enjoyed by many including fishermen and swimmers.

Transportation
The Manor Park neighbourhood is served by a Halifax Transit route, the 62 Grahams Grove, which connects the Penhorn Terminal and the Bridge Termonal via Downtown Dartmouth and the Alderney Gate ferry terminal.

References

Communities in Halifax, Nova Scotia
Dartmouth, Nova Scotia